Caryocar glabrum is a species of tree in the family Caryocaraceae. It is native to South America.

Chemical compounds 
Dihydroisocoumarin glucosides can be found in C. glabrum.

References

External links

glabrum
Plants described in 1806
Trees of Peru
Trees of Brazil